King Cole is a figure of British folklore.

King Cole may also refer to:
King Cole (baseball) (1886–1916), Major League Baseball pitcher
"Old King Cole" (also known as "King Cole"), a nursery rhyme
Nat King Cole (1919–1965), pianist and singer

See also
Cole (disambiguation)